Amyntas is the name of several prominent Greek and Hellenistic men. It later became a stock name for lovelorn shepherds in 16th-century pastoral literature. The name is derived from Greek "amyntor" meaning "defender."

Kings of Macedon
Amyntas I of Macedon, king of Macedon (c. 540–498 BC)
Amyntas II of Macedon, king of Macedon
Amyntas III of Macedon, king of Macedon (393–369 BC)
Amyntas IV of Macedon, king of Macedon (359 BC)

Military figures
Amyntas (son of Andromenes), general of Alexander the Great, died in 330 BC
Amyntas (son of Antiochus), fugitive to Persians
Amyntas (son of Arrhabaeus), hipparchos
Amyntas (son of Alexander)
Amyntas, father of taxiarch Philip 
Amyntas, father of Philip and first father-in-law of Berenice I of Egypt
Amyntas (Antigonid general), died in Cappadocia 301 BC
Amyntas of Rhodes, admiral against Demetrius Poliorcetes
Amyntas of Pieria, 2nd Thessalian praetor 194 BC
Amyntas of Mieza, somatophylax of Philip III Arrhidaeus
Amyntas II (son of Bubares), Persian ruler of Alabanda

Hellenistic kings
Amyntas Nikator, Indo-Greek king who ruled in parts of the northern Indian subcontinent between 95 and 90 BC
Amyntas of Galatia, tetrarch of the Trocmi and king of Galatia (37–25 BC)
Amyntas, Tetrarch of the Tectosagii, king of Cilicia Trachae between 36 BC and 25 BC

Writers
Amyntas of Heraclea, mathematician; student of Plato
Amyntas (bematist), wrote Stathmoi
Amyntas the surgeon

Athletes
Amyntas of Aeolia in diaulos
Amyntas of Ephesus, pankratiast
 Amyntas (son of Menophilos), Aiolian, winner of the horse race at the Greater Amphiareia, beginning of the first century

Fictional shepherds
Amyntas, the title shepherd in Torquato Tasso's play Aminta, translated into English by Leigh Hunt as Amyntas, a Tale of the Woods
Amyntas, the title shepherd in Thomas Watson's Latin eclogue cycle Amyntas
Amyntas, the title shepherd in Thomas Randolph's play Amyntas, or The Impossible Dowry
Amyntas, a shepherd in love with Cloris in Samuel Daniel's play The Queene's Arcadia

References